Robert Theodore Hope Mackenzie (8 October 1886 – 20 March 1934) was an English cricketer born in Poona, India.  Mackenzie was a right-handed batsman who bowled right-arm fast.

MacKenzie was educated at Cheltenham College, where he played for the college cricket team from 1903 to 1906.  In 1905, he made his Minor Counties Championship debut for Devon against Glamorgan.  The following season he played his second and final match for Devon, against Dorset.  In 1907, he made his first-class debut for Cambridge University against Lancashire.  In the same season he played two County Championship matches for Gloucestershire against Northamptonshire and Worcestershire, both played at the Spa Ground, Gloucester.  In 1908, he played his second and final first-class match for Cambridge University against the Marylebone Cricket Club.

He died in New Delhi on 20 March 1934.

References

External links
Robert MacKenzie at ESPNcricinfo
Robert MacKenzie at CricketArchive

1886 births
1934 deaths
Cricketers from Pune
People educated at Cheltenham College
Alumni of the University of Cambridge
English cricketers
Devon cricketers
Cambridge University cricketers
Gloucestershire cricketers
Sportspeople from Gloucestershire
British people in colonial India